The Sentimental Policeman is a 1992 Ukrainian (Ukrainian-French production) comedy film written and directed by Kira Muratova. It entered the competition at the 49th Venice International Film Festival.

Plot

A child is found in a cabbage, and the event will change the life of the policeman Tolley.

Cast
 Nikolai Shatokhin 	 		
 Irina Kovalenko 	 	
 Natalya Ralleva  	
 Dasha Koval

References

External links

1992 films
French comedy films
1992 comedy films
Films directed by Kira Muratova
1990s Russian-language films
Ukrainian comedy films
1990s French films
Fictional portrayals of police departments in Ukraine